The John and Fredericka Meyer Schnellbacher House is a historic residence located southwest of Winterset, Iowa, United States.  The Schnellbachers were native Germans who settled in Madison County in 1855.  He farmed , and was a preacher affiliated with the Evangelical Association of Ohio.  This house is an early example of a vernacular limestone farmhouse.  The 1½-story structure is composed of locally quarried stone that is almost ashlar finished and rubble.  It features unique window and door surrounds on the main facade, a stone chimney, and an exposed basement.  The house was listed on the National Register of Historic Places in 1987.

References

Houses completed in 1856
Vernacular architecture in Iowa
Houses in Madison County, Iowa
National Register of Historic Places in Madison County, Iowa
Houses on the National Register of Historic Places in Iowa
1856 establishments in Iowa